The men's singles WH1 tournament of the 2019 BWF Para-Badminton World Championships took place from 20 to 25 August.

Seeds 

 Thomas Wandschneider (first round)
 Choi Jung-man (semi-finals)
 Qu Zimao (world champion)
 Lee Dong-seop (final)
 David Toupé (first round)
 Young-chin Mi (quarter-finals)
 Hiroshi Murayama (first round)
 Osamu Nagashima (first round)

Group stage 
All times are local (UTC+2).

Group A

Group B

Group C

Group D

Group E

Group F

Group G

Group H

Knock-out stage

References 

2019 BWF Para-Badminton World Championships